This is a comparison of binary executable file formats which, once loaded by a suitable executable loader, can be directly executed by the CPU rather than being interpreted by software. In addition to the binary application code, the executables may contain headers and tables with relocation and fixup information as well as various kinds of meta data. Among those formats listed, the ones in most common use are PE (on Microsoft Windows), ELF (on Linux and most other versions of Unix), Mach-O (on macOS and iOS) and MZ (on DOS).

Notes

References 

Computing comparisons